"Better Off Ned" is the 16th episode of the thirty-first season of the American animated television series The Simpsons, and the 678th episode overall. It aired in the United States on Fox on March 15, 2020. The episode was dedicated to actor Max von Sydow who died on 8 March 2020 and had previously guest-starred in the episode "The War of Art" as Klaus Ziegler.

Plot
At the Springfield Retirement Castle after telling him a war story and pranking him with it, Grampa gives Bart a dud grenade.

Bart takes it to a school assembly and pranks them the same way Grampa did, scaring everyone away while ambulances and firefighters are called. Ned Flanders throws himself on top of the bomb to sacrifice himself to save the school and Bart is forced to reveal the prank. Superintendent Chalmers wants to expel Bart from school, but Ned intervenes, volunteering to supervise Bart the right way with the three P's: persistence, prayer and persistent prayer.

At the Flanders house, Bart tries Ned's patience so Ned takes him fishing. Bart manages to catch a fish and Ned teaches him how to roast it on a fire. Bart also joins the church choir and everyone congratulates Ned for turning Bart around. The news about Ned's influence to Bart spread around Springfield, making Homer jealous.

Feeling useless, Homer walks around the city until he finds a sad Nelson Muntz at the Springfield City Dump, crying due to his situation at home. Homer brings him to Krusty Burger and offers to become his mentor, making Bart jealous. Seeing the problems that he is causing, Lisa asks Homer to seek counseling. Homer goes to a therapist that disagrees with his methods. Homer goes then to see Nelson, but finds his mother, who asks him if he is going to leave them too, like all the other men have in the past, breaking Nelson's heart.

When Homer explains the situation to Nelson, Nelson prepares a plan to get even with Bart at the Christian Pride Parade, trying to activate the mechanism that Bart and the Flanders built, the praying hands, when Bart passes through. Homer spots Nelson, and pushes Bart away in time, getting squashed by the hands himself. The two ride in the ambulance together. Homer apologizes to Nelson and guides him to Ned as a mentor.

Reception
Dennis Perkins of The A.V. Club gave this episode a C−, stating that “‘Better Off Ned’ isn’t just a lousy half-hour (minus commercials, minus three episode-ending tags in place of any sort of resolution) of The Simpsons because it’s double-dipping on the same premise. It’s a truly lousy episode because it fairly rings with indifference, glib cruelty, and enough lamp-shading of creative exhaustion to serve as platonic ideal for late-run ‘is that show still on?’ disposability”.

Den of Geek gave this episode 3 out of 5 stars.

On July 28, 2020 this episode was nominated for an Emmy for outstanding voiceover performance by Nancy Cartwright as Bart Simpson, Nelson, Ralph and Todd.

References

External links
 

The Simpsons (season 31) episodes
2020 American television episodes